USS Dace (SSN-607), a  submarine, was the second ship of the United States Navy to be named for the dace, any of several small North American fresh-water fishes of the carp family. The contract to build her was awarded to Ingalls Shipbuilding in Pascagoula, Mississippi on 3 March 1959 and her keel was laid down on 6 June 1960. She was launched on 18 August 1962, sponsored by Betty Ford, wife of future President of the United States Gerald Ford, and commissioned on 4 April 1964.

History from 1964 to 1988 needed.

Dace was decommissioned and stricken from the Naval Vessel Register on 2 December 1988. Ex-Dace entered the Nuclear Powered Ship and Submarine Recycling Program in Bremerton, Washington and on 1 January 1997 ceased to exist.

See also 
Admiral Kinnaird R. McKee, USN, who commanded USS Dace.
During portions of the 1960s and 1970s, Dace conducted classified operations in several oceans. Read Blind Man's Bluff (The Untold Story of American Submarine Espionage), Sontag and Drew, 1998 for examples of these types of operations and the men who served.

References 
 
  Navsource.org: USS Dace
  Navysite.de: USS Dace

 

Ships built in Pascagoula, Mississippi
Permit-class submarines
Cold War submarines of the United States
Nuclear submarines of the United States Navy
1962 ships